Hefti is a surname, and may refer to:

 Beat Hefti (born 1978), Swiss bobsledder
 David Philip Hefti  (born 1975), Swiss composer and conductor
 Neal Hefti (1922–2008), American jazz trumpeter, composer, tune writer, and arranger
 Silvan Hefti (born 1997), Swiss footballer

See also

 Hefty (disambiguation)